Kicktails are the upwards bent tips of a skateboard deck, today considered vital to a skateboard. The front kicktail is usually called the nose while the back kicktail is referred to as the tail. Kicktails are nowadays key to maneuvering the board, especially in street skateboarding.

History
As the name suggests, kicktails first emerged in the back end of a skateboard only. As street skating progressed, they were made to the front ends of skateboards in an attempt to increase the height of ollies, succeeding beyond all expectations and pushing the sport even further. Kicktails are also found on some longboards. They are now emerging onto the scene with the ever so popular "indo boards", which are balance trainers. They say the kicktail will help with big tricks, pivots, slides, ollies and much more.

Introduced by Larry Stevenson in 1969 U.S. Patent #3,565,454 with the following description:
The rear end section of a skateboard mounts an inclined lever that is sloped upwardly and rearwardly from the skateboard. In order to practice otherwise difficult spinning or pivoting maneuvers such as wheelies with much improved balance and safety, a person places his rear foot upon and depresses the lever to tilt the skateboard upwardly into a position for the desired maneuver.

American inventions
Skateboarding equipment